Ynyrga (Inırgı) is a rural locality (a selo) and the administrative centre of Ynyrginskoye Rural Settlement of Choysky District, the Altai Republic, Russia. The population was 516 as of 2016. There are 9 streets.

Geography 
Ynyrga is located east from Gorno-Altaysk, in the valley of the Sarakoksha River, 36 km southeast of Choya (the district's administrative centre) by road. Syoyka is the nearest rural locality.

References 

Rural localities in Choysky District